Brigadier-General Henry Francis Brooke (1838–1880), commanding the 2nd Infantry Brigade, Kandahar Field Force, was an Irish officer in the British Army. He was killed in a sortie from Kandahar on 16 August 1880, while endeavouring to save the life of a fellow officer.

Life

Origins 
Henry Francis Brooke was the eldest son of George and Lady Arabella Brooke, of Ashbrooke, County Fermanagh. He was born on 3 August 1836. At the age of eighteen years he was gazetted, in June 1854, to an ensigncy in the 48th Foot.

The Crimea 
Landing with the 48th Regiment in the Crimea on 21 April 1855, Brooke served with it in the siege and fall of Sebastopol, earning the Crimea Medal with clasp and the Turkish Medal.

China 
Throughout the campaign of 1860 in China, Brooke acted as Aide-de-Camp to Sir Robert Napier, being present in that capacity at the action of Tangku, the assault of the Taku Forts—in which he was severely wounded,—and the final advance on and surrender of Pekin. For his services on these occasions, for which he was several times mentioned in despatches, he received the brevet of Major and the Second China War Medal with two clasps.

Staff appointments 
In addition to the post of Aide-de-Camp to Sir Robert Napier in China, General Brooke held, in the course of his career, the following staff appointments:

 Brigade Major, Bengal, from 14 April 1863 to 3 January 1865;
 Assistant Adjutant-General, from 3 January 1865 to 23 April 1866, and again from 31 July 1872 to 18 January 1876;
 Deputy Adjutant-General, Bengal, 19 January 1876 to 15 November 1877;
 Adjutant-General (local Brigadier-General), Bombay, 23 November 1877 to 28 March 1880;
 Brigadier-General, Commanding 2nd Infantry Brigade, Kandahar, 28 March 1880 till the day of his death.

In order to assume command of a brigade on active service, he gave up temporarily the better paid and more comfortable, though responsible position, of Adjutant-General of the Bombay Army.

Afghanistan 

General Brooke arrived at Kandahar about 23 April 1880, and at once assumed the command of the garrison, which, up to the date of his arrival, had been held—in addition to the chief command of the forces in Southern Afghanistan—by General Primrose. He made a thorough and complete inspection of the limits of his command, and of the troops placed at his disposal; and placed on record his sense of the very imperfect condition of the fortifications, pointing out the obvious necessity for some defensive works being at once thrown up. These representations were re-submitted, on his arrival shortly afterwards, by General Burrows. Economy being, however, necessary, it was considered by the authorities inadvisable to incur the considerable charges which would be entailed by placing the defences of the city in a satisfactory state.

General Brooke's next care was to make himself acquainted with the surrounding country; and many were the excursions carried out by him over road, by-path, hill-pass, and river, to a distance of fifteen miles in every direction. Accompanied sometimes by a small party of officers, sometimes merely by an escort of a couple of sowars, one a qualified interpreter, he would start at daybreak, and after remaining for an hour or two in some village or orchard to converse with the natives, would return to barracks late in the day. In this manner he had made himself thoroughly acquainted with the environs of the city—a most necessary knowledge in a country so deficient in road-communication as Kandahar. It was due also to General Brooke's representations that a system of cavalry patrols and reconnaissances was initiated, which, though not furnished to the extent which he deemed advisable, was productive of good, and increased the general stock of knowledge.

Thus affairs went on till the approach of Ayub Khan's army began to arouse the turbulent spirits among the population, and disturbances began. General Brooke and Major Adam were fired upon on 16 July in the Morcha Pass by a party among the rocks above them; and though the hill was surrounded by cavalry till nightfall, and a party of infantry was scrambling over it all the day, no trace of the would-be assassins was found. Their shots only killed one of the sowar's horses.

Then the news of Maiwand was brought in. It was in compliance with Brooke's request, personally made and strongly urged, that the small detachment of all arms was sent out under his command to cover the last few miles of the retreat. Though the relief it was able to render was restricted by the orders it received not to proceed beyond the village of Kokaran, several lives were probably saved through its instrumentality, the large bodies of the country people, who had collected on either side of the route, dispersing rapidly on its approach.

On General Brooke's return to the city at about 2 p.m., after an absence of some seven hours, it was discovered that the orders for the withdrawal of the outlying corps, which it had been found necessary to issue, had been misunderstood. Instead of having packed up everything, and brought it into the central enclosure, preparatory to the retirement to the city, most of the troops in the cantonments had withdrawn at once, leaving their baggage and camp equipage in their quarters, where it had been looted by the villagers. Portions of it were subsequently recovered by detachments sent out for the purpose. By nightfall all the troops were withdrawn into the city, in an orderly manner, under General Brooke's directions.

In the train of important subsequent events—including the elaborate and eagerly pushed forward defence of the city, the house-to-house visitation, and search for arms in the disaffected quarters, and the ultimate extramural ejection of the Pathans—the energy and perseverance of General Brooke were conspicuous.

Death 

On 16 August, the sortie of that day, to the village of Deh Khwaja, was undertaken in opposition both to his own advice and to that of General Burrows. The sortie had been planned for the previous week, but abandoned in deference to their opinion. Other counsel, however, prevailed; and on the evening of 15 August, General Brooke was told that the operation was to be carried out, and that he was to have the command. He was emphatic in expressing his disapproval of the project, and desired to place on record his opinion of the unwisdom of the movement. His phrase was: "It will either be a walk over, or a very serious business. In the former case, it will be useless as a demonstration; in the latter, it must entail heavy loss."

After the two attacking columns had forced their way under a heavy fire through the southern portion of the village, General Brooke, in the face of remonstrances, returned almost alone to render assistance to Captain Cruickshank, of the Royal Engineers, and a party who were endeavouring to escort that officer, then dangerously wounded, to the walls. Running the gauntlet of the village, attended by his mounted trumpeter (Mr. Glynn, of Battery C/2, Royal Artillery, who remained with him till he fell, and miraculously reached Kandahar unwounded), and assisted by a sergeant of the 7th Fusiliers, he succeeded in reaching Captain Cruickshank, and began to carry him towards the Kabul gate. It was in this enterprise that he lost his life.

Honours 

  Crimea Medal with clasp
  Turkish Crimea Medal
  Second China War Medal with two clasps
  Afghanistan Medal (posthumous)

References

Bibliography 

 Boase, Frederic (1892). "Brooke, Henry Francis". In Modern English Biography. Vol. 1: A–H. Truro: Netherton and Worth. p. 416.
 Brooke, Annie, ed. (1881). Private Journal of Henry Francis Brooke … from April 22nd to August 16th, 1880. Dublin: William Curwen.
 Hanna, Henry Bathurst (1910). The Second Afghan War 1878–79–80: Its Causes, Its Conduct, and Its Consequences. Vol. 3. London: Constable & Co. Ltd. pp. 424–461.
 Roberts, Frederick Sleigh (1897). Forty-one Years in India: from Subaltern to Commander-in-chief. Vol. 2. London: Richard Bentley and Son. p. 351
 Robson, Brian (1986). The Road to Kabul: The Second Afghan War 1878–1881. Arms and Armour Press. pp. 239, 246, 255.
 Shadbolt, Sydney H. (1882). The Afghan Campaigns of 1878–1880. Vol. 1: Biographical Division. London: Sampson Low, Marston Searle, and Rivington. pp. 24–26, 61, 66, 138, 237. 
 "General Order. Military Department. Simla, the 27th September, 1880". The London Gazette. No. 24903. 19 November 1880. pp. 5799–5824.
 "The Late Brigadier-General H. F. Brooke". The Illustrated London News. No. 2155. Vol. LXXVII. 18 September 1880. p. 289.

External links 

 Ockerbloom, John Mark, ed. "Brooke, Henry Francis, 1836–1880". Online Books Page. Retrieved 8 May 2022.
 "Afghanistan 1878–80". Redcoats: Officers Died. Retrieved 8 May 2022.

1836 births
1880 deaths
British military personnel of the Second Anglo-Afghan War
British Army brigadiers
British Army personnel of the Crimean War
British Army personnel of the Second Opium War
British military personnel killed in action